Euprosopus is a genus of beetles in the family Cicindelidae, containing the following species:

 Euprosopus chaudoirii Thomson, 1859
 Euprosopus quadrinotatus (Latreille & Dejean, 1822)

References

Cicindelidae